Buckskin Frontier is a 1943 American Western film directed by Lesley Selander and written by Norman Houston and Bernard Schubert. The film stars Richard Dix, Jane Wyatt, Albert Dekker, Lee J. Cobb, Victor Jory, Lola Lane, Max Baer and Joe Sawyer. The film was released on May 14, 1943, by United Artists.

Plot

Kansas settler Jeptha Marr is leery of the railroad intruding on his territory, and opposes railroad representative Stephen Bent, only to be surprised when daughter Vinnie returns to the town of Pawnee after a long absence and is already acquainted with Stephen.

A rival railroad interest spearheaded by Champ Clanton tries to muscle its way in, trying to taint Stephen's reputation by insinuating a relationship with Rita Molyneaux, a woman with a bad reputation. By the end, though, Vinnie is reassured that Rita is actually interested in Gideon Skene, and the railroad is headed Pawnee's way under Stephen's watch.

Cast  
Richard Dix as Stephen Bent
Jane Wyatt as Vinnie Marr
Albert Dekker as Gideon Skene
Lee J. Cobb as Jeptha Marr
Victor Jory as Champ Clanton
Lola Lane as Rita Molyneaux
Max Baer as Tiny
Joe Sawyer as Brannigan
Harry Allen as McWhinny
Francis McDonald as Duval
George Reeves as Surveyor
Bill Nestell as Whiskers

References

External links 
 

1943 films
American black-and-white films
1940s English-language films
Films scored by Victor Young
Films directed by Lesley Selander
United Artists films
1943 Western (genre) films
American Western (genre) films
1940s American films